The Burnett-Fletcher Chair of History at the University of Aberdeen, was founded in 1903. The professorship was established upon funds left by John Burnett, merchant in Aberdeen, and by Mary E. Fletcher, widow of Robert Fletcher. It is a general chair in history, not dedicated to a particular field or subject area. It was originally named the Burnett-Fletcher Chair of History and Archaeology.

Holders of the Burnett-Fletcher Chair of History 
Professor C.S. Terry 1903–1930
Professor J.B. Black 1930–1953
Professor G.O. Sayles 1953–1962
Professor John D. Hargreaves 1962–1985
Professor Peter H. Ramsey 1986–1992
Professor Allan I. Macinnes 1993–2007
Vacant 2007–2013
Professor Robert I. Frost 2013–present

References

Bibliography

Professorships at the University of Aberdeen